D'Aguesseau is a French surname. Notable people with the surname include:

Henri François d'Aguesseau (1668–1751), chancellor of France
Henri-Cardin-Jean-Baptiste d'Aguesseau (1752–1826), French politician
Henriette Anne Louise d'Aguesseau (1737–1794), French salon hostess and duchess

French-language surnames